Uhtred is a masculine given name of Anglo-Saxon origin, prevalent during the Medieval period. It may refer to:

People
 Uhtred of Hwicce (died c. 779), King of Hwicce
 Uhtred (Derbyshire ealdorman) (early to mid 10th century), ealdorman (earl) in Derbyshire
 Uhtred of Lindisfarne, Bishop of Lindisfarne, appointed in 942?
 Uhtred of Bamburgh (died 1016), ealdorman of Northumbria under King Æthelred II of England
 Uchdryd ap Edwin (late 11th to early 12th century) Welsh noble  linked to the castle at Cymer 
 Uhtred (Bishop of Llandaff), Welsh Bishop of Llandaff from 1140 to 1148
 Uhtred of Galloway (c. 1120–1174), Lord of Galloway
 Uthred of Boldon (c. 1320–1397), English Benedictine theologian and writer

Fictional characters
 Uhtred of Bebbanburg, protagonist of The Saxon Stories, a historical novel series by Bernard Cornwell and The Last Kingdom TV series
 Uchdryd Battle Protector, Uchdryd Cross Beard, and Uchdryd son of Erim are warriors named in the 11th century Welsh Arthurian tale of Culhwch and Olwen

See also 
 Oughtred

References

Masculine given names